Dikimdya is the name of several rural localities in the Sakha Republic, Russia:
Dikimdya, Gorny District, Sakha Republic, a selo in Mytakhsky Rural Okrug of Gorny District
Dikimdya, Nyurbinsky District, Sakha Republic, a selo in Dikimdinsky Rural Okrug of Nyurbinsky District
Dikimdya, Olyokminsky District, Sakha Republic, a selo in Kindigirsky Rural Okrug of Olyokminsky District